Sonny Stitt Swings the Most is an album by saxophonist Sonny Stitt recorded in 1959 and released on the Verve label.

Reception
The Allmusic site awarded the album 3 stars.

Track listing 
All compositions by Sonny Stitt except as indicated
 "Lonesome Road" (Nathaniel Shilkret, Gene Austin) - 4:04    
 "The Gypsy" (Billy Reid) - 4:03    
 "That's The Way To Be" - 2:08    
 "There Is No Greater Love" (Isham Jones, Marty Symes) - 5:02   
 "Jaunty" - 5:11    
 "Blue Sunday" - 3:24    
 "The Way You Look Tonight" (Dorothy Fields, Jerome Kern) - 5:02
Recorded in New York City on February 9 (tracks 3 & 7) and in Los Angeles, California on December 21 (track 6) and December 23 (tracks 1, 2, 4 & 5), 1959

Personnel 
Sonny Stitt - alto saxophone, tenor saxophone (track 7), vocals (track 3)
Lou Levy (tracks 1, 2 & 4-6), Amos Trice (tracks 3 & 7) - piano
Leroy Vinnegar (tracks 1, 2 & 4-6), George Morrow (tracks 3 & 7) - bass
Mel Lewis (tracks 1, 2 & 4-6), Lenny McBrowne (tracks 3 & 7) - drums

References 

1960 albums
Verve Records albums
Sonny Stitt albums